The 2003 Slovak Figure Skating Championships were held in Bratislava from January 10 through 11, 2003. Skaters competed in the disciplines of men's singles and ladies' singles on the senior level.

Results

Men

Ladies

External links
 results

Slovak Figure Skating Championships, 2003
Slovak Figure Skating Championships
Slovak Figure Skating Championships, 2003